Pylore Krishnaier Rajagopalan is an Indian vector control scientist, biologist and acarologist, known for his pioneering contributions to the control programmes against vector-borne diseases in India. He is a former director of the Indian Council of Medical Research managed Vector Control Research Centre, Pondicherry. He graduated in 1949 from the Banaras Hindu University and obtained a Masters in Zoology with University First Rank there itself in 1951. In 1952 he joined the fledgling Virus Research Centre in Pune, and worked under the supervision of some of the finest vector control specialists such as Dr T Ramachandra Rao. In recognition of his outstanding work as a young research scientist, in 1957 he was awarded a Fellowship by the Rockefeller Foundation to pursue a Master's program in Public Health from the University of California. He went on to secure a Diploma in Acarology from the University of Maryland at College Park.

He returned to India in 1960 and rejoined the Virus Research Centre where he was asked to lead the investigation into the mysterious Kyasanur Forest Disease in rural Karnataka. The origins of the disease was unknown. His pioneering work on the role of migratory birds in spreading disease vectors as part of the investigation into KFD, conducted under the supervision of the eminent ornithologist the late Dr Salim Ali, led to his doctoral degree from Pune University.

He was then assigned as a Senior Scientist to the World Health Organization Project on Genetic Control of Mosquitoes in New Delhi, during which time he expanded the body of knowledge on mosquito population behaviour.  In 1975 he was posted to Pondicherry where he founded the Vector Control Research Centre - a research centre set up to study ecological control of vector borne diseases.

The VCRC, under his leadership, contributed significantly to the control of Japanese Encephalitis in Burdwan District. However its flagship achievement under the leadership of Dr Rajagopalan was to pioneer the technique of Biological Control, which combined minimal chemical intervention with environmental measures and the use of natural mosquito larval predators to bring down the incidence of diseases like filariasis. This was demonstrated spectacularly over five years in Pondicherry and Shertallai in Kerala.

He has travelled extensively all over the world. He was a Rockefeller Fellow; member of STAC (Scientific and Technical Advisory Committee) of WHO; WHO Expert committees on Malaria, Filariasis and Vector Control; WHO Steering committee of TDR (Tropical Diseases Research) on Filariasis and Biological Control of Vectors. He was also WHO consultant for malaria control in Sri Lanka, Indonesia, and Vietnam.

He has published more than 200 scientific papers while in service. He started a M.Sc. Medical Entomology course at the VCRC for the first time in India, and which turned more than 100 graduates. He had also guided 18 students for Ph.D. while at the VCRC.

After his superannuation in 1990, he served the World Health Organization as a member of their steering committees on Filariasis and on biological control of vectors. He is a fellow of the Royal Society of Tropical Medicine, UK and is credited with several articles on vector control and acarology. He continues to write and talk on Vector Control issues to schools, universities and research bodies.

Scientific Interests 
Dr Rajagopalan has worked extensively on ecological aspects of vector borne diseases  for four decades on a variety of diseases in India. Summarising his vast body of work:

 Japanese Encephalitis and its control in several states;
 On ticks and mites, small mammals, birds, and on the Epidemiology of Kyasanur Forest Disease;
 Genetic control of mosquitoes;
 Integrated vector control  methods with community participation to control Bancroftian Filariasis in Pondicherry
 Elimination of Brugian Filariasis in Shertallai;
 Control of Island Malaria in Rameswaram and Riverine and urban malaria in Salem
 Malaria control in Coastal villages of Pondicherry; Malaria control in Tribal areas of Orissa, etc.)

He started a M.Sc. Medical Entomology course at the VCRC for the first time in India, and which turned more than 100 graduates. He had also guided 18 students for Ph.D. while at the VCRC.

Lifelong Learner 
Dr Rajagopalan has continuously kept himself abreast with the body of knowledge in vector biology. He has received extensive  training on arboviruses  from 406th SEATO research Centre, Bangkok, at the National Institutes of Health, Tokyo, at theTrinidad Regional Virus Laboratory, Port-of-Spain and at the East African Virus Laboratory in Entebbe in Uganda.  He sharpened his knowledge of Malaria vector control at the Malaria Research Institute, Amani in Tanzania and on mosquito taxonomy from P.F.Mattingly at British Museum (Natural History), London. He had the privilege of learning  Ecology under Charles Elton at Bureau of Animal Populations, Oxford; and  Acarology under Dr Hoogstraal, US Naval Medical Research Unit in Cairo during his career. The great Ornithologist, Dr Salim Ali, was his Ph.D.guide. Having worked extensively in the field investigating diseases with unknown etiology, and on the epidemiology of many vector borne diseases in the field all his life, he is a complete biologist. He was associated with Dr Jorge Boshell and many others of the Rockefeller Foundation for two decades.

In his work on the Filariasis Control Program in Pondicherry, Dr Rajagopalan personally learnt and applied the then new field of population statistics in the field to establish a control parameter for the Program.

Awards and honours 
He was awarded P.N.Raju oration award of ICMR in 1980, for his outstanding contribution in the field of vector biology and control; the prestigious Om Prakash Bhasin Award for Science and Technology was awarded in the field of Health Sciences, in 1985; Charles University, Prague, Gold Medal for his long standing contribution to science in 1988; Britain’s prestigious  Royal Society of Biology elected him as Fellow in 1989., The Royal Society of Tropical Medicine elected him as a Fellow (Tropical Medicine) in 1990.

In recognition of his body of scientific work, he was honoured with a Padma Shri by President R Venkataraman in 1990.

Post Retirement 
In the years after retirement, he continues to serve thereafter in many institutions in advisory committees and also in teaching as visiting professor at the SRM University School of Public Health. In his post retirement period, he published scores of critical articles on Public Health in India, wrote many articles on Popular Science, Social and Esoteric subjects as well and which have been published and welcomed.  

Life Time Achievement awards were presented to him by:

(1) the Association of Medical Microbiologists of India;

(2) National Congress of Parasitology, and,

(3) Anna University Department of Biotechnology, Chennai.

(4) In 2014, he was honored by the School of Public Health, SRM University, Chennai (India’s largest and richest private University) at the First Global Public Health Conference for his lifelong contribution to Public Health.

(5) In January 2016, the National Vector Borne Disease Control Programme and The Indian Association of Epidemiologists, at their meeting at Bangalore, conferred another Life Time Achievement award on him.

(6) On February 27, 2017, the National Academy of Vectors and Vector Borne Diseases and the Central University of Tamil Nadu at Thiruvarur, at a glittering function gave yet another Life Time Achievement Award to him.   

(7) The Frontline News Magazine, in its issue of April 28, 2017, published an article about his life and achievements, “Battle against Mosquitoes”, written by Dr A. Raman, Professor at Charles Strut University, Australia.

(8) On 13 February 2019, the Society for Vector Ecology (SOVE) – The Indian Chapter—at its first meeting  in Panjim, Goa, conferred the Dr T.Ramachandra Rao memorial Gold Medal along with a Shield and a Citation, for his outstanding achievements in the Field of Medical Entomology. He delivered an Oration on Malaria, and this was published in April 2019.

Selected bibliography

References

Recipients of the Padma Shri in medicine
Year of birth missing
Year of death missing
People from Palakkad district
Scientists from Kerala
20th-century Indian biologists
Banaras Hindu University alumni
University of California alumni
World Health Organization officials
Savitribai Phule Pune University alumni
University of Maryland School of Medicine alumni
Indian officials of the United Nations